Salehabad-e Hesar-e Shalpush (also Romanized as Şāleḩābād-e Ḩeşār-e Shālpūsh; also known as Şāleḩābād and Şāleḩābād-e Şādeq) is a village in Malard Rural District, in the Central District of Malard County, Tehran Province, Iran. At the 2006 census, its population was 350, in 98 families.

References 

Populated places in Malard County